Henry Charles Newton (1805-1882) was a British painter, and one of the original founders of the art material company Winsor & Newton.

Biography

In 1832, together with William Winsor, chemist, Newton founded Winsor & Newton in a small shop at 38 Rathbone Place in London, his home, "which was then part of an artists’ quarter in which a number of eminent painters, including John Constable, had studios, and other colourmen were already established".

"In 1832, both men were in their late twenties and shared an interest in painting.  Newton was the more artistically gifted of the two whereas Winsor, who also painted, contributed the scientific knowledge that was to be so important".

William Winsor died in 1865. A few months before his own death in 1882 Newton sold the business to the newly incorporated firm of Winsor & Newton Ltd. which included members of both families amongst the shareholders.

The company continues to manufacture fine art materials, and is known for its watercolour paints.

Henry Newton died on the 7th April 1882 and is buried with his wife Eleanor on the western side of Highgate Cemetery.

References

Further reading
Details from National Portrait Gallery

External links 
 Winsor & Newton

1805 births
1882 deaths
Burials at Highgate Cemetery
19th-century English painters
English male painters
19th-century English businesspeople
British companies established in 1832
British Royal Warrant holders
19th-century English male artists